The Peru national baseball team is the national baseball team of Peru. The team represents Peru in international competitions.

References

National baseball teams
baseball
Baseball in Peru